was a Japanese volleyball player who played for Toray Arrows.

She is Kana Oyama's younger sister.

Toray announced that she will become a beach volleyball player.

Clubs 
 Seitoku Gakuen high school
 Toray Arrows (2004–2010)

Awards

Team 
2007 Domestic Sports Festival (Volleyball) -  Champion, with Toray Arrows
2007-2008 Empress's Cup -   Champion, with Toray Arrows
2007-2008 V.Premier League -  Champion, with Toray Arrows
2008 Domestic Sports Festival -  Runner-Up, with Toray Arrows
2008-2009 V.Premier League -  Champion, with Toray Arrows
2009 Kurowashiki All Japan Volleyball Championship -  Champion, with Toray Arrows
2009-2010 V.Premier League -  Champion, with Toray Arrows
2010 Kurowashiki All Japan Volleyball Championship -  Champion, with Toray Arrows

References

External links
Toray Arrows Women's Volleyball Team

Japanese women's volleyball players
Living people
People from Tokyo
1985 births